Catherine de Parthenay (22 March 1554 – 26 October 1631) was a French noblewoman and mathematician.   She studied with mathematician François Viète and was considered one of the most brilliant women of the era.  She married Charles de Quelennec, and after his death married René II, Viscount of Rohan, a Huguenot.

Life 

Catherine was the heiress to the rich Huguenot Parthenay-Leveque family that originated from the Poitou region. She was the granddaughter of Michelle de Saubonne.

At a young age she showed an interest in astrology and astronomy. Following this interest and obvious intellect, her mother sought a tutor for Catherine. Considered the greatest mathematician of his time, Francois Viete was hired by Catherine's mother as her tutor. 
Francois taught Catherine a slew of subjects such as; geography, current discoveries, cosmographic knowledge, and of course, math, most likely sparking her greater interest in mathematics and shaping her into a mathematician.

At a very early age, she married Charles de Quelennec, the baron of Pont-l'Abbé, who died during the night of the St. Bartholomew's Day massacre while defending Coligny.

A widow at eighteen years old, Catherine was a good match and was considered one of the most intelligent women of her time. She was courted by René, the youngest son in the Rohan family but Catherine, beautiful as she was, did not accept to marry him until he became the viscount of Rohan and subsequently inherited the fortune of the Rohan family after the death of his eldest brother.

Her children include:

 Henriette de Rohan (1577-1624?);
 Henri II, Duke of Rohan, a famous soldier and author;
 Catherine de Rohan, ancestor to several famous people, among them Queen Elizabeth II
 Benjamin, Duke of Soubise;
 Anne de Rohan (1584-1646) Poet

Quote

In a letter to her mother before leaving for the Castle Bridge, Catherine writes a letter to her mother where she announces that she should be given more credit for what she now writes under duress:

"I, Catherine de Parthenay certify that belong to all, that can not resist the will and strength of Mr. Bridge, am forced to follow my great regret and displeasure, for the reasons that follow; namely, that forced me to give Madame de Soubise, my lady mother, seriously ill in this place, to which I wish, as I am required to do so by divine law and human, do help, and service. Joint I feel my conscience charged estimating and fearing that God is very much offended, said Sieur remains with me and I with him, as if he was my husband and the husband; what not, all still there two years and more, we are joined together by Marriage Contract, if not currently there was nothing; and flee to the same state that I was the eve of my wedding, and what have been since my birth. What I wanted to leave in writing and signed by my hand, Madame my mother for me to use in time, place, attesting to God and his angels, that's the truth. Made in La Rochelle this Sept. 6, 1570.

References

Further reading
 Women of Science
 Protestant.org
 Relation

French women poets
French women scientists
Women mathematicians
16th-century French dramatists and playwrights
French women dramatists and playwrights
1554 births
1631 deaths
French Calvinist and Reformed Christians
Catherine
16th-century women scientists
17th-century women scientists